Kiu Kwan Mansion is a 27-storey,  residential skyscraper at 395 King's Road, North Point in Hong Kong. When it topped out on 5 July 1966, it was the tallest building in Greater China, surpassing Park Hotel Shanghai, which held the title for 32 years.

Since 1963, the Wah Fung Chinese Goods Centre, an eclectic emporium of Chinese-made goods, with a Fujian flair, has occupied the Ground, First and Second floors of the building - one of two Hong Kong branches and the city's largest department store when it opened. 

Kiu Kwan Mansion was refurbished in 1996 and 2007.

Gallery

See also
  Timeline of tallest buildings in Hong Kong

References

External links

Residential buildings completed in 1966
Residential buildings in Hong Kong
Residential skyscrapers in Hong Kong